Government High School Jhelum is an education institute of Jhelum District,  Punjab, Pakistan.

History
School is one of oldest educational institution in the Jhelum District as it was established in early 1930s. School has honor to produce many renowned student. Former Indian Prime Minister Inder Kumar Gujral had also studied at the school for sometime. Lt Gen Masood Aslam, Former Corps Commander Peshawar and now Ambassador of Pakistan in Mexico is also Alumni of the school. The school is owned by the Education Department Government of the Punjab, and also affiliated with Rawalpindi Board of Intermediate and Secondary Education.

Notable alumni
Inder Kumar Gujral
Lt Gen Masood Aslam

References

Schools in Punjab, Pakistan